The Robert Award for Best Cinematography is one of the merit awards presented by the Danish Film Academy at the annual Robert Awards ceremony. The award has been handed out since 1984.

Honorees

1980s 
 1984: Dan Laustsen for 
 1985:  for The Element of Crime
 1986: Mikael Salomon for 
 1988: Jörgen Persson for Pelle the Conqueror
 1989: Dan Laustsen for

1990s 
 1990: Dan Laustsen for The Miracle in Valby
 1991:  for 
 1992:  for Europa
 1993: Jan Weincke for Pain of Love
 1994: Jan Weincke for Black Harvest
 1995: Eric Kress for Riget
 1996: Anthony Dod Mantle for 
 1997: Robby Müller for Breaking the Waves
 1998: Jan Weincke for Barbara
 1999: Anthony Dod Mantle for The Celebration

2000s 
 2000:  for 
 2001: Eric Kress for Flickering Lights
 2002: Jens Schlosser for The King Is Alive
 2003: Dan Laustsen for I Am Dina
 2004: Anthony Dod Mantle for It's All About Love
 2005: Rasmus Videbæk for King's Game
 2006: Manuel Alberto Claro for Allegro
 2007: Jørgen Johansson for Prag
 2008: Dan Laustsen for Just Another Love Story
 2009: Jørgen Johansson for Terribly Happy

2010s 
 2010: Anthony Dod Mantle for Antichrist
 2011: Magnus Nordenhof Jønck for R
 2012: Manuel Alberto Claro for Melancholia
 2013: Rasmus Videbæk for A Royal Affair
 2014: Larry Smith for Only God Forgives
 2015: Manuel Alberto Claro for Nymphomaniac Director's Cut

See also 

 Bodil Award for Best Cinematographer

References

External links 
  

1984 establishments in Denmark
Awards established in 1984
Awards for best cinematography
Cinematography